David Wise may refer to:

David Wise (freestyle skier) (born 1990), American freestyle skier
David Wise (cricketer) (born 1966), former English cricketer
David Wise (composer), British video game music composer
David Wise (journalist) (1930-2018), American investigative journalist and writer, winner of the 1975 Orwell Award
David Wise (writer) (1955-2020), American television writer
David S. Wise, computer scientist and co-inventor with Daniel P. Friedman of lazy futures

See also
David Burgess-Wise, motoring author and automobile historian